Battle Creek is a stream in the U.S. state of Oregon. It is a tributary to Evans Creek.

Battle Creek was named for a skirmish (Battle of Evans Creek) fought by a local militia against Native Americans.

References

Rivers of Oregon
Rivers of Jackson County, Oregon